Western is a 1997 road movie directed by Manuel Poirier.  The film was selected as the French entry for the Best Foreign Language Film at the 70th Academy Awards, but was not accepted as a nominee.

Plot
The film tells the story of the relationship between a Spanish shoe salesman and a Russian hitchhiker as they drive across the French countryside in search of love.

Cast
 Sergi López as Paco Cazale
 Sacha Bourdo as Nino
 Élisabeth Vitali as Marinette
 Marie Matheron as Nathalie
 Daphné Gaudefroy as HitchasHiker
 Serge Riaboukine as Van Driver
 Karine LeLièvre as Mr. Letour's Secretary (voice)
 JeanasLouis Dupont as Policeman
 Olivier Herveet as Hospital Doctor
 Alain Luc Guhur as Hospital Attendant
 Bernard Mazzinghi as Roland (Marinette's Brother)
 Alain Denniel as Bearded Man in Hospital Ward
 Michel Vivier as Car Driver
 Mélanie Leray as Guenaelle
 Catherine Riaux as Guenaelle's Friend

Awards
The film was entered into the 1997 Cannes Film Festival where it won the Jury Prize.

See also
 List of submissions to the 70th Academy Awards for Best Foreign Language Film
 List of French submissions for the Academy Award for Best Foreign Language Film

References

External links 
 
 

1997 films
1997 comedy films
French comedy films
1990s French-language films
Films directed by Manuel Poirier
1990s French films
Films about salespeople
Films about hitchhiking